= Bagoniya =

- village
- Location within Madhya Pradesh Location within India
- Coordinates: 23.3889311°N 77.2807423°E
- Country: India
- State: Madhya Pradesh
- District: Bhopal
- Tehsil: Huzur
- Elevation: 520 m (1,710 ft)

Population (2011)
  - Total: 1,633
- Time zone: UTC+5:30 (IST)
- ISO 3166 code: MP-IN
- 2011 census code: 482355

Bagoniya is a village in the Bhopal district of Madhya Pradesh, India. It is located in the Huzur tehsil and the Phanda block.

== Demographics ==
According to the 2011 census of India, Bagoniya has 303 households. The effective literacy rate (i.e. the literacy rate of population excluding children aged 6 and below) is 58.59%.

Demographics (2011 Census)
	Total	Male	Female
Population	1633	862	771
Children aged below 6 years	254	133	121
Scheduled caste	511	279	232
Scheduled tribe	0	0	0
Literates	808	502	306
Workers (all)	932	487	445
Main workers (total)	628	392	236
Main workers: Cultivators	206	148	58
Main workers: Agricultural labourers	374	228	146
Main workers: Household industry workers	32	7	25
Main workers: Other	16	9	7
Marginal workers (total)	304	95	209
Marginal workers: Cultivators	62	4	58
Marginal workers: Agricultural labourers	230	87	143
Marginal workers: Household industry workers	1	1	0
Marginal workers: Others	11	3	8
Non-workers	701	375	326
